Seamus Donal D'Arcy (14 December 1921 – 22 February 1985), known as Jimmy D'Arcy or sometimes Paddy D'Arcy, was a Northern Irish international footballer who played as an inside forward.

Career 
After playing in the Republic of Ireland for Waterford, Limerick, Dundalk and in Northern Ireland for Ballymena United, D'Arcy played professionally in the Football League for Charlton Athletic, Chelsea and Brentford, before his retirement in 1954. He also represented the IFA XI. An ankle injury ended D'Arcy's career in 1954 and the following year he returned to Charlton Athletic to serve as Development Association Officer for eight months.

Personal life 
After retiring from football, D'Arcy settled in Sudbury and worked as a quality inspector for a local glass manufacturing company.

Career statistics

References

External links 
Profile at Post War English & Scottish Football League A – Z Player's Transfer Database
Profile at Northern Ireland's Footballing Greats

1921 births
1985 deaths
Association footballers from Northern Ireland
Northern Ireland international footballers
Waterford F.C. players
Limerick F.C. players
Dundalk F.C. players
Ballymena United F.C. players
Charlton Athletic F.C. players
Chelsea F.C. players
Brentford F.C. players
English Football League players
League of Ireland players
NIFL Premiership players
Charlton Athletic F.C. non-playing staff
Association football forwards
Newry City F.C. players